Spidey is a comic book series published by Marvel Comics. The series focuses on a young Peter Parker as opposed to the regular Spider-Man series.

Reception
The series holds an average rating of 8.2 by 39 professional critics on the review aggregation website Comic Book Roundup.

Prints

Issues

Collected editions

References

External links
Marvel page: S2015

Spider-Man titles
2015 comics debuts